Markus Schairer (born 4 July 1987 in Bludenz) is an Austrian snowboarder.

Career
He received a silver medal in snowboard cross at the 2008 Winter X Games XII in Aspen, Colorado, behind winner Nate Holland.

He received a silver medal in snowboard cross at the 2007 Junior World Championships in Bad Gastein, behind Stian Sivertzen.

References

External links
 
 

1987 births
Living people
Austrian male snowboarders
Olympic snowboarders of Austria
Snowboarders at the 2010 Winter Olympics
Snowboarders at the 2014 Winter Olympics
Snowboarders at the 2018 Winter Olympics
X Games athletes
Sportspeople from Vorarlberg
People from Bludenz